Khajuraho railway station is located in Chhatarpur district of Madhya Pradesh and serves as an entry point for the Khajuraho Group of Monuments, medieval Hindu  famous for their erotic sculptures. Between 950 and 1150, the Chandela monarchs built these temples.

History

The Jhansi–Manikpur line was opened in 1889 by Indian Midland Railway. A branch line linking Khajuraho to Mahoba on the Jhansi–Manikpur line was inaugurated in 2008. Khajuraho is linked by train to Jhansi on the Delhi–Chennai line and Kanpur on the Howrah–Delhi line.

Amenities
There is a cloak room at Khajuraho railway station where one can leave one's luggage for a nominal payment. Small shops sell Khajuraho local maps.

Passenger movement
Khajuraho railway station handles around 3,000 passengers every day.

As of 2016 January, it is connected by a daily train to Delhi via Mahoba, Jhansi and Gwalior. It is also connected by a daily train that connects it to Agra, Jaipur and Udaipur. A local daily train also connects to Kanpur and Varanasi is connected thrice a week.

Trains 

 Khajuraho–Hazrat Nizamuddin Uttar Pradesh Sampark Kranti Express
 Khajuraho–Udaipur City Express
 Bundelkhand Express
 Bhopal–Khajuraho Mahamana Superfast Express
 Dr. Ambedkar Nagar–Prayagraj Express
 Mahoba–Khajauraho Passenger
 Khajuraho–Virangana Lakshmibai Passenger
 Khajuraho–Kanpur Passenger

References

External links
 Trains at Khajuraho

 – 25 km from Khajuraho

Railway stations in Chhatarpur district
Railway stations opened in 2008
Jhansi railway division
Transport in Khajuraho